The following is a list of Winthrop Eagles men's basketball seasons. The Eagles compete in the NCAA's Division I as a member of the Big South Conference. They have played their home games in the 6,100–seat Winthrop Coliseum since 1982. The Eagles are currently led by head coach Pat Kelsey.

Winthrop's basketball program began in 1978 as a member of the National Association of Intercollegiate Athletics (NAIA). In 1985, the team made an immediate jump to the Big South Conference where they currently compete. In thirty years, Winthrop has won ten conference tournament championships as well as seven regular season championships, the most recent of which came in 2008. Most notably, the Eagles won the Big South Conference tournament in 2007 and subsequently upset the sixth-seeded Notre Dame Fighting Irish, 74–64, as the 11-seed in the first round of the 2007 NCAA Tournament. It was the Eagles' first and currently only NCAA tournament victory in program history.

Seasons

Statistics
Statistics correct as of the end of the 2018–19 NCAA Division I men's basketball season

References

 
Winthrop
Winthrop Eagles basketball seasons